Sean Patrick McDonnell (born October 15, 1956) is a retired college football coach and former player, best known for his tenure as head football coach at the University of New Hampshire.

Biography

McDonnell, nicknamed "Coach Mac", served as the head football coach of the New Hampshire Wildcats football program from 1999 to 2021. From August 2019 to March 2020, took a leave of absence for medical reasons, with associate head coach Ricky Santos acting as interim head coach for the 2019 season. McDonnell returned to coaching in March of 2020. McDonnell announced his retirement on December 1, 2021, at the conclusion of his 30th year as a coach for New Hampshire and 23rd year as head coach of the program.

McDonnell won the Eddie Robinson Award in 2005 and 2014, which is given annually to the top head coach in the NCAA Division I Football Championship Subdivision (FCS). McDonnell ranks third all-time in Colonial Athletic Association (CAA) victories. He ranks second all-time in wins at New Hampshire, only behind the College Football Hall of Fame inductee he once coached under, Bill Bowes. McDonnell is one of 13 FCS coaches with over 150 wins all-time as a head coach, and also had six wins versus Football Bowl Subdivision (FBS) opponents. McDonnell coached as players or had as assistants multiple people who went on to become college football head coaches, including: Ryan Day (Ohio State), Chip Kelly (UCLA), Joe Conlin (Fordham), Tony Trisciani (Elon), Dan Curren (Merrimack), Mike Letchen (University of New England), Ryan Carty (University of Delaware) and his successor at New Hampshire, Ricky Santos. McDonnell has two sons. He lives with his wife in Durham, New Hampshire.

Head coaching record

Notes

References

External links
 New Hampshire profile

1956 births
Living people
American football defensive backs
Boston University Terriers football coaches
Boston College Eagles football coaches
Columbia Lions football coaches
Hamilton Continentals football coaches
New Hampshire Wildcats football coaches
New Hampshire Wildcats football players
People from Durham, New Hampshire
Sportspeople from Strafford County, New Hampshire
Sportspeople from Saratoga Springs, New York
Coaches of American football from New York (state)
Players of American football from New York (state)